Harbin is the capital and largest city of Heilongjiang province, People's Republic of China.

Harbin may also refer to:

Institutions and organizations
Harbin Aircraft Manufacturing Corporation (HAMC)
Harbin Clinic, a clinic-hospital in Rome, Georgia, U.S.
Harbin Hot Springs, a non-profit holistic retreat and workshop center in Lake County, north of Napa Valley, California, U.S.
Harbin Pharmaceutical Group Co., Ltd., China's second-biggest drug maker by market value.

People
 John Harbin (born 1947), Australian sports coach
 Robert Harbin (1909–1978), British magician and author
 Sherry Harbin, American academic
Suzette Harbin (1915–1994), African-American actress and dancer

Places
U.S.
Harbin, Georgia in Gwinnett County, Georgia
Harbin, Tennessee in Roane County, Tennessee
Harbin, Texas in Erath County
Harbin Mountain, a mountain in Lake County, California

Other
Harbin Beer, brewed by Harbin Brewery, China
Harbin Ferris Wheel, in Harbin, China
Harbin Hall, a building on the Georgetown University campus, Washington, D.C., U.S..

See also
Harbine, Nebraska in Jefferson County, Nebraska